Minimay is a small town located in Victoria, Australia. The town is in the Shire of West Wimmera  from the South Australian border, about halfway between Melbourne and Adelaide.  At the 2016 census, Minimay and the surrounding area recorded a population of 84. A signpost outside the town lists the town's population at 9.

Geography
Farming is the main industry in Minimay and includes sheep and cattle breeding and arable crops. Center pivot irrigation is used to water crops and give satellite images of the area a characteristic patchwork pattern of green circles. Before agriculture, the area was quite wooded; at the time trees were cleared, agriculture in Australia was not advanced and initial attempts to grow crops required much manual labour, and the town consequently had a higher population.

Sporting 

Sports today in Minimay is extinct with locals travelling to other sporting clubs in the district—including football and netball clubs. Minimay originally had a golf club, basketball club, tennis club, racecourse, football club and cricket club.

Football 
Border Districts Football Netball Club was originally a combined team with Minimay and Frances and today also includes Goroke. The club plays in the Kowree-Naracoorte-Tatiara Football League. The football ground still exists. Border District football club won premierships in 1962, 1967, 1975, 1979, 1980, 1981, 1991, 1992 and 1996.

Cricket 
The Minimay Cricket Club is one of the oldest bodies in the district. Records are poor but, an old minute book suggests that the club was formed before 1896. The Minimay Cricket Club also won premierships during the 1900s. The cricket club now has been extinct for a long time.

Tennis 
Tennis was first played in Minimay on a dirt court was in 1913. 
The Minimay Tennis Club was first formed in 1919. Today the courts are in a different position than what they first were. 1967 they rebuilt the third court. Minimay again won many premierships in Tennis. The courts were last used in 1985 when the sport wasn't played any more.

Basketball 
Minimay Basketball Club started in 1946. 
The Minimay Basketball team won ten premierships.

Minimay Race Club started in the early 1900s. Minimay Golf Club had nine holes course which was founded in 1931 and the Golf Club lasted for only 8 years.

History 

There have been two churches in Minimay; the first church was Catholic and the second dating from 1953 was the Union church.

Minimay Post Office opened on 1 November 1877. In  the  early  1880s  selectors  were  taking  up  320-acre  blocks  in  the Minimay area.

In 1885, a new school in Minimay  was designated: Minimay  School  No.2600. The school consisted of a small room which could hold 30 to 40 children. The school was closed in 1902 while it was painted and repaired. The school had planned to enlarge in 1906; this did not happen until 1911. A new school was built as the old school was infested by white ants. In 1951 the school was closed and most students went to a school in nearby Goroke.

The poet John Shaw Neilson grew up in Minimay in the 1880s.

The Minimay Public Hall was built in 1901 to 1975. The Hall was opened 15 February 1991. In 1975 the old Hall was removed to make way for the new Minimay Memorial Hall. For the opening of the Minimay Memorial Hall the community had a ball. Today the Hall still is used for many fund-raising and community events.

The first general store in Minimay was built in the 1880s. The first owners were from Harrow and they were Mr. and Mrs. Egan. The store had three rooms and a veranda. After a few years the owners left and the store was destroyed by fire. Mr. Carracher from the general store in Frances decided to build a new one in Minimay in 1901. In 1941 the president Mrs. McIntosh purchased the store. The shop was demolished on 12 February 1976. Later a new Minimay store was built and this still runs. The store sells groceries and is a post office agency.

Work commenced to construct a telephone line, connecting Minimay to Goroke, in 1908.

References 

 History of Minimay and District. Published 1976

Wimmera
Towns in Victoria (Australia)